The Proceedings of the Institution of Mechanical Engineers, Part N: Journal of Nanoengineering and Nanosystems is a peer-reviewed scientific journal covering nanoscale engineering, nanoscience, and nanotechnology. It was established in 2004 and is published by SAGE Publications on behalf of the Institution of Mechanical Engineers.

Abstracting and indexing 
The journal is abstracted and indexed in Scopus, Compendex, and CSA's Advanced Polymers Abstracts, Composites Industry Abstracts, and Earthquake Engineering Abstracts.

References

External links 
 

Engineering journals
English-language journals
Institution of Mechanical Engineers academic journals
Nanotechnology journals
Publications established in 2004
Quarterly journals
SAGE Publishing academic journals